Detroit drill is a subgenre of drill music, centered in Detroit, Michigan, in the United States, that began as a derivative of the drill music scene in Chicago and New York City and later became a derivative of UK drill with its 808 percussion and sliding notes by producers from the UK drill scene. Detroit drill emerged around 2019 with the single "MWBL" by 42 Dugg and Tee Grizzley. It was made popular in the mainstream with the 2021 single "4 Da Gang" by 42 Dugg. Other notable Detroit drill artists include Icewear Vezzo, Sada Baby, and Teejayx6.

History 
Detroit drill music first gained attention with the 2019 single "MWBL" by 42 Dugg and Tee Grizzley. Detroit drill differentiates from Chicago, New York, and UK drill by its fast detroit style rapping with drill type beats.

Characteristics 
The Detroit drill sound is a combination of fast detroit rapping with trap and drill combo beats.

See also 
Drill music
Brooklyn drill
UK drill

References 

Drill music